"Boy Oh Boy" is a song by American DJ and record producer Diplo and EDM duo GTA. It was released on October 7, 2013 via Mad Decent. The song was from Diplo's compilation album Random White Dude Be Everywhere.

Composition 
The song uses a sample from "Work it" (2002) by Missy Elliot,  and it is written in the key of C♯ Minor, with a tempo of 130 beats per minute.

Music video 
The music video was released on March 26, 2014, and it was made with the help of fans, showed many vines like: "flamboyant dancing, dogs DJing, sports fails, and of course, an abundance of twerking."

Charts

Weekly charts

Year-end charts

References 

2013 songs
2013 singles
Diplo songs
Songs written by Diplo